Uyun sahira (lit. “Bewitching Eyes”) is an Egyptian film released in 1934. It is often considered the first Egyptian horror film.

The 28th feature film released in Egypt and a first for speculative fiction, it was a breakthrough by the standards of the time if not today. The subject matter, regarding the soul and death, was subject to controversy. Some government censors and scholars at Al-Azhar University, including the latter's Grand Imam Muhammad al-Ahmadi al-Zawahiri, considered the film sacrilegious. They were overruled by then-Prime Minister Abdel Fattah Yahya Pasha, who authorized screening on the grounds that the heroine was dreaming all along. Public reception was largely positive, and the film was a box office success.

Synopsis
Delilah, a singer, seems at first to be in mutual love with a young man named Sami, but her club won't let him in much, and he grows distant while she grows fonder. She accosts him demanding he reconsider, jumping into his car as he leaves the club. Sami's car crashes, throwing him to his death, but Delilah escapes. Heartbroken and traumatized, she visits his grave in the dead of night and performs occult rituals to revive him. Sami's ghost appears and instructs her to inject the blood of a virgin girl into the corpse to reincarnate him. Delilah, whose eyes are famously captivating, roams around Cairo until she happens upon a destitute lottery ticket seller named Hayat, proceeding to lead her back to Sami's grave. Once she completes the transfusion, Delilah realizes the girl is channeling Sami's emotions; Sami pinches Delilah's arm and tries to escape with Hayat, leading a new love between the two to break the spell and dash Delilah's dreams once more. Delilah is awoken by her maid to find it was all a dream.

Cast
 Assia Dagher (Delilah)
 Ahmad Galal (Sami)
 Abdel Salam Al Nabulsy
 Mary Queeny (Hayat)
 Youssef Saleh

External links
 IMDb page

References	

Egyptian horror films
1934 films
1934 horror films
1930s Arabic-language films